Ankur Narula Ministries (The Church of Signs and Wonders) is a church ministry in Punjab, India. It was established in 2008 in Jalandhar, Khambra. Ankur Yoseph Narula is the Senior Pastor and Overseer in the Church of Signs and Wonders.

The church's live services are broadcast through Anugrah TV. The church has a congregation of more than 300,000 people attending weekly services.

History 

Ankur Yoseph Narula is the Senior Pastor and Overseer in the Church of Signs and Wonders. Born in a non-Christian family, Ankur Narula converted to Christianity and started his ministry with 3 people in 2008. The church grew to 500 members in the year 2009, and as of 2022, the church has 300,000 members.

See also
 Punjabi Christians
 Christianity in India

References

External links
 ankurnarula.org Ankur Narula Ministries official website
 anugrah.tv Anugrah TV channel website

Christianity in Punjab, India
Christianity in Punjab, Pakistan
Evangelical megachurches in India
21st-century churches in India